The Weyanoke people were an Indigenous people of the Northeastern Woodlands.

Name 
Their name is also spelled Weyanock, as British colonist John Smith recorded on his map. Alternative spellings include Weanoc, Weanock, Winauh, Winauk, Wynauh, and Wynauk. Their name may mean "at the bend" of a river, coming from either the Eastern Niantic or Nipmuck language.

Territory 

Their lands were located along the James River and west of the mouth of Appomattox River, near present-day Weyanoke, Virginia. Their main capital settlement was at Weyanoke Point in Charles City County, Virginia. Their second primary settlement was at the head of Powell's Creek in Prince George County, Virginia.

History 
At the beginning of the 17th century, when the tribe had early contact with English colonists, the Weynock traded with Wahunsenacawh (Powhatan, c. 1547–c. 1618). Some historians considered them to be a part of the Powhatan Confederacy.

Their population was 500 in 1608. After attacks by the Iroquois Confederacy at the end of the 17th century, they migrated out. They signed the Treaty of Middle Plantation with the Virginia Colony in 1677.

Remnants of the Weyanock and the Nansemond joined the Nottoway in the early 18th century.  

By 1727, they lived along the Nottoway River.At the end of the 18th century, the Weyanock merged completely into the Nottoway, with the surnames Wynoake and Wineoak occasionally appearing on public documents.

Notes

References 
 Hodge, Frederick W. Handbook of North American Indians. Washington, DC.: Government Printing Press, 1912.
 
 

Eastern Algonquian peoples
Extinct Native American tribes
Indigenous peoples of the Southeastern Woodlands
Native American history of Virginia
Native American tribes in Virginia